Jewry is a surname. Notable people with the surname include:

 Bernard Jewry, birth name of English rock singer and stage actor Alvin Stardust (1942–2014)
 Laura Jewry, birth name of English writer Laura Valentine (1814–1899)